Sefwi-Bibiani District is a former district council that was located in Western Region (now currently in Western North Region), Ghana. Originally created as an district council in 1975. However on 1988, it was split off into two new district assemblies: Sefwi-Wiawso District (capital: Wiawso), Juaboso-Bia District (capital: Juaboso) and Bibiani/Anhwiaso/Bekwai District (capital: Bibiani). The district council was located in the northern part of Western Region and had Wiawso as its capital town.

References

Districts of the Western Region (Ghana)